HK Television Entertainment Company Limited (or ViuTV) is a television service operator in Hong Kong operated by Hong Kong billionaire Richard Li's PCCW, through its subsidiary PCCW Media, which also owns an IPTV platform, Now TV and operating an OTT service, Viu.

History
The company was launched in January 2010, HKTVE has applied for an over-the-air license for PCCW Limited. HKTVE's license was formally approved by the Hong Kong government on the first day of April 2015, concurrent with the announcement that ATV's over-the-air license would be revoked on 31 March 2016.

Upon approval, HKTVE plan to launch a Cantonese channel within 12 months and an English channel within 24 months. The Cantonese service and ATV's replacement, ViuTV, will operate on a 24-hour schedule, While the English channel, ViuTVsix, will also operate on a 17-hour schedule. The licence was issued on a 12-year term, subject to a mid-term review in 2021.

Artists

Groups
Except for PIX3L, the label of Universal Music, all of its groups are the labels of Music Nation Records, a music company owned by Richard Li.

 COLLAR
 ERROR
 MIRROR
 P1X3L

Individuals (Male)

 Thor Lok
 Johnny Hui
 Brian Chan
 Colin Chan
 Dixon Wong
 Janzen Tsang
 Vincent Tang

Individuals (Female)

 Hailey Chan
 Shirley Sham
 Bonde Shum
 Katherine Chan
 Sarika Choi
 Mishy FIsh
 Florica Lin
 Alina Li
 Kathy Wong
 Wayii Cheng
 Gloria Cheung
 Pony Tsoi
 Ranya Lee
 Ah Gi
 Melody
 Yoyo Kot
 Alice Hui
 Sica Ho
 Win Win Yeung
 Ash Chung

Notable shows from ViuTV
Survival Show:
:
 Goodnight Show - King Maker (2018)
 King Maker II (2019)
 King Maker III (2020)
 King Maker IV (2021)
Music Show 
 Chill Club (2019-)
Music Award 
 Chill Club Awards (2021-)
Drama
 Leap Day (2020)
 Ossan's Love HK (2021)
Game Show
 ERROR Crazy Trip (2019)
 be On Game (2020)
 ERROR Selfish Project (2021)
 Battle Feel (2021)
 be On Game Season 2 (2021)
Talk Show
 Talker - Helmet Intercom (2016-)

References

Television stations in Hong Kong
Television channels and stations established in 2010